Gihanga is a commune of Bubanza Province in north-western Burundi. The capital lies at Gihanga city. The provincial capital is located in Bubanza.

Towns and villages
 Gihanga (capital)  Buramata  Gihungwe  Kagwena  Mpanda  Mukindu  Murira  Muyange  Ninga  Nyeshanga  Rushakashaka

Communes of Burundi
Bubanza Province